Bonit Wiryawan Sugiharto  (born 10 February 1968) is a former professional tennis player from Indonesia.

Biography
Wiryawan grew up in Surabaya, as one of six siblings. A right-handed player, he began competing on tour in the late 1980s.

At the 1990 Asian Games he won three bronze medals for Indonesia, in the men's doubles, mixed doubles and team event. 

He represented Indonesia at the 1992 Summer Olympics in Barcelona, partnering Hary Suharyadi in the doubles competition, where they beat a Korean pair in the first round, before losing in the second round to the eventual bronze medalists from Croatia.

In both 1994 and 1995 he appeared in the singles main draw of the Jakarta Open ATP Tour tournament, losing to world number seven Michael Chang in the former. As a doubles player he made the semi-finals of the Jakarta Open in 1995, with partner Suwandi Suwandi.

He won numerous medals at the Southeast Asian Games, including a men's doubles gold in 1997 and mixed doubles gold in 2001. 

During his 16-year Davis Cup career he featured in 29 ties for Indonesia, the last in 2007 as a 39 year old. He retired from Davis Cup competition as Indonesia's most successful doubles player in history, with 16 wins.

See also
List of Indonesia Davis Cup team representatives

References

External links
 
 
 

1968 births
Living people
Indonesian male tennis players
Sportspeople from Surabaya
Tennis players at the 1992 Summer Olympics
Olympic tennis players of Indonesia
Asian Games medalists in tennis
Asian Games silver medalists for Indonesia
Asian Games bronze medalists for Indonesia
Tennis players at the 1990 Asian Games
Tennis players at the 1994 Asian Games
Medalists at the 1990 Asian Games
Medalists at the 1994 Asian Games
Southeast Asian Games gold medalists for Indonesia
Southeast Asian Games silver medalists for Indonesia
Southeast Asian Games bronze medalists for Indonesia
Southeast Asian Games medalists in tennis
Competitors at the 1997 Southeast Asian Games
Competitors at the 2001 Southeast Asian Games
21st-century Indonesian people
20th-century Indonesian people